The Adventures of Sebastian the Fox is a 1963 Australian children's series. The show combined a string puppet, a mischievous fox named Sebastian, who was placed in real-life settings. It was among the first shows of its kind produced in Australia, as it was very different from earlier Australian children's series like Peters Club and Tarax Show. The Sebastian puppet was designed and operated by puppeteer Peter Scriven.

The music was composed by George Dreyfus, who became a leading Australian composer. The score was subsequently arranged by Dreyfus for various small ensemble combinations for performance by young musicians as a complete concert.

Episodes
Sebastian and the Sausages - Sebastian steals sausages cooked by a tramp.
Sebastian and the Burglar - Sebastian seeks refuge in a house at the same time as a burglar.
The Bomb 
The Animal Catcher - Sebastian is caught by a pet catcher
The Sleepwalkers - Sebastian dresses up as a ghost
The Showman - a greedy showman exploits Sebastian's talents as a violinist
The Gold Mine - Sebastian buys a gold mine.	
The Painter - Sebastian enters an artist's studio.
The Doll's House - Sebastian decides to move into a doll's house.	
The Castaway - Sebastian gets shipwrecked.
The Classroom - Sebastian plays up in a classroom.
The Potters - Sebastian moves into a potter's studio.	
The Fashion Parade - Sebastian wanders into the middle of the judging of the Best Dressed Man of the Year Competition.

References

External links

Sebastian the Fox at National Film and Sound Archive
Sebastian the Fox at AustLit

1963 Australian television series debuts
1963 Australian television series endings
Australian children's television series
Black-and-white Australian television shows
English-language television shows
Australian Broadcasting Corporation original programming
Television series about foxes